Devante Lavon Andrew Dewar-Cole (born 10 May 1995) is an English professional footballer who plays as a striker for EFL League One club Barnsley.

Early and personal life
Cole was born in Alderley Edge on 10 May 1995.
His father is the former Manchester United, Newcastle United and England striker Andy Cole. He has stated that he is a different type of player to his father, who played in the same position, and that he wants to make a name for himself.
His paternal grandparents migrated to England from Jamaica in the 1960s; his grandfather worked as a miner.

Club career

Manchester City
Cole joined Manchester City in April 2003, at the age of seven. He had previously spent a day training with city rivals Manchester United. His first involvement with the Manchester City first team came in July 2013 when he was selected for a pre-season friendly tour of South Africa, subsequently playing against SuperSport United.

Cole featured heavily in the 2013–14 UEFA Youth League scoring 6 goals and finishing as the second highest scorer overall as Manchester City made a run to the quarter-final stage of the competition.

He was linked with a loan move to Scottish club Motherwell in August 2014.

Loan to Barnsley
On 19 August 2014, Cole signed on loan for Barnsley until 5 January 2015. He made his professional debut the same day, appearing as a substitute in a League One game away to Coventry City. He scored his first goal for the club in his second appearance, a 4–1 home win over Gillingham.

Loan to Milton Keynes Dons
He moved on loan to Milton Keynes Dons in January 2015.

Bradford City
On 28 August 2015, Cole signed for Bradford City on a two-year deal, with the option of a third year, after being released by Manchester City. Bradford City manager Phil Parkinson praised Cole's pace. Before signing for them, he had been on trial with West Ham United and had been linked with a transfer to both Birmingham City and Preston North End. Manchester City have retained a sell-on clause from the deal, believed to be 30%. Cole made his debut a day later, appearing as a substitute. He scored on his debut in the 4th minute of injury time to earn City a 1–0 victory. Cole's potential development was praised by City manager Phil Parkinson. New striker partner James Hanson also discussed their teamwork, and the improvement in Cole's all-round game was praised by manager Phil Parkinson in October 2015.

Fleetwood Town
Cole signed for Fleetwood Town on 22 January 2016, for an undisclosed fee. He said he felt the new club suited him better than Bradford had done.

Wigan Athletic
Cole signed for Wigan Athletic in January 2018. He moved on loan to Burton Albion in August 2018.

Loan to Motherwell
On 2 July 2019, Cole joined Motherwell on an initial six-month loan deal.

Doncaster Rovers
He was transferred to League One side Doncaster Rovers on 27 January 2020 on an initial deal until the end of the season. He was released by Doncaster at the end of the 2019–20 season.

Motherwell
On 2 October 2020, Cole returned to Motherwell on a contract until the end of the 2020–21 season.

Barnsley
On 8 June 2021 it was announced that he would sign for Barnsley on a three-year contract.

International career
Cole has represented England at under-16, under-17, under-18, and under-19 levels.

Cole made his debut for the England under-19 team on 5 March 2014 in a friendly match against Turkey, starting the game and scoring the opening goal. On 29 May 2014, he made a further appearance from the start in a European Championship elite qualification match against Ukraine, which England lost to a deflected 94th-minute strike that eliminated them from the final tournament.

Career statistics

Honours
Milton Keynes Dons
Football League One runner-up: 2014–15

References

Living people
1995 births
People from Alderley Edge
Sportspeople from Cheshire
Black British sportsmen
English people of Jamaican descent
English footballers
England youth international footballers
Manchester City F.C. players
Barnsley F.C. players
Milton Keynes Dons F.C. players
Bradford City A.F.C. players
Fleetwood Town F.C. players
Wigan Athletic F.C. players
Burton Albion F.C. players
Motherwell F.C. players
Doncaster Rovers F.C. players
English Football League players
Scottish Professional Football League players
Association football forwards